Hommarting is a commune in the Moselle department in Grand Est in north-eastern France.

Geography 
This municipality is located in the historic region of Lorraine and is part of the pays de Sarrebourg. 

It is located in the Rhine watershed within the Rhine-Meuse basin. It is drained by the Eichmatte stream, the Muellermatte stream, the Bubenbach stream and the Steiglenbach.

Toponymy 
Former names: Humertingen (XVe siècle), Hummertingen (1490), Humertingen and Hommertingen (1525), Humerting (1556), Humerding (1675), Homertingen or Omertingen (1719), Homarting (1756), Hommartin (1793), Hommartingen (1871-1918), Humbertingen (1940-1944).

History 
Hommarting was a former possession of the Weissembourg and Marmoutier abbeys, as well as of the Bishopric of Metz. It was also held in fief by numerous lords (Lutzelbourg, Lening-Réchicourt).

In 1661, with the treaty of Vincennes between the duke of Lorraine and Louis XIV, the commune became French.

See also 
 Communes of the Moselle department

References

External links 
 

Communes of Moselle (department)